The Absence is a Canadian drama film, directed by Brigitte Sauriol and released in 1976. The film stars Frédérique Collin as Louise, a successful photographer whose estranged father Paul (Jean Gascon) returns after an absence of 20 years, as he is suffering from a terminal illness and needs her help.

The film's cast also includes Jocelyn Bérubé, Louisette Dussault, Guy Thauvette and Monique Mercure.

The film was screened at the inaugural 1976 Festival of Festivals.

References

External links
 

1976 films
1976 drama films
Canadian drama films
1970s French-language films
Films directed by Brigitte Sauriol
French-language Canadian films
1970s Canadian films